The legendary island of Atlantis has often been depicted in literature, television shows, films and  works of popular culture.

Fiction

Start of genre fiction
Before 1900 there was an overlap between verse epics dealing with the fall of Atlantis and novels with a pretension to fine writing which are now regarded as pioneering genre fiction. Jules Verne's  20,000 Leagues Under The Sea (1869/71) includes a visit to sunken Atlantis aboard Captain Nemo's submarine Nautilus – with protagonists walking for miles over the sea bottom until reaching the impressive sunken ruins, an obvious impossibility (Verne was not aware of water pressure in the ocean deeps). In Elizabeth Birkmaier's Poseidon's Paradise: the Romance of Atlantis (San Francisco 1892), the island sinks following an earthquake. C. J. Cutcliffe Hyne also depicted the end of Atlantis in his fantasy The Lost Continent: The Story of Atlantis, first published in 1899. The main character there, the soldier-priest Deucalion, is unable to prevent the tragic decline of his continent under the rule of the evil queen Phorenice. And according to D. Bridgman-Metchim, the author of Atlantis, the Book of the Angels (London 1900), his account is an interpretation of the Book of Genesis which covers all the events which immediately preceded the Flood, as recorded by one of the fallen angels.

After 1900
(Alphabetical by author, then by title)
In Poul Anderson's 1971 novel The Dancer from Atlantis, the Atlantis myth refers to the volcanic explosion of Thera which is considered to have destroyed Minoan civilization. Therefore, the dancer of the  title is in fact from Crete.

In Anderson's 1961 novelette "Goodbye, Atlantis!" the soon-to-be-sunken continent of Atlantis has undergone a radical social revolution, with an ideology similar to Communism. As a last-ditch effort, the diehard remnants of the old regime invoke savage old gods, which the Atlanteans have forgotten for many centuries. The wakened vengeful deities have no interest in the Atlanteans' political and ideological struggles, and simply destroy the entire continent and everyone on it.   
 The Mutation (1999), from K. A. Applegate's series of novels Animorphs, featured one incident in which the small group pursue their alien enemies, the Yeerks, and inadvertently find a hostile civilization in a city at the bottom of the ocean. The civilisation, known as the Nartec, tell their own tale as to how they came to be under the sea, but although Marco jokingly suggests that the group have discovered Atlantis, the name never appears. After the Animorphs make their escape, the Nartec do not appear or are even mentioned in later novels, leaving their fate undetermined.
 Another series by K. A. Applegate, Everworld, depicts Atlantis as an underwater city in Everworld's oceans. The gods Poseidon and Neptune---who both seem to have their own underwater cities nearby---war over control of the city, but the politically savvy leader of the city, Jean-Claude LeMieux, manages to keep it independent.
 Alexander Beliaev, famous Russian sci-fi writer, depicted the last days of Atlantis in his 1926 novel "The Last Man From Atlantis", the highlight of the book being the love story of princess Sel and sculptor Adishirna.
 Pierre Benoit's classic L'Atlantide (1919) was a variation on a theme introduced by Henry Rider Haggard in She, and told the story of two French Officers who find the lost city of Atlantis in the midst of the Sahara, and fall in love with its beautiful queen, Antinea. It was filmed several times.
 Marion Zimmer Bradley's The Fall of Atlantis (1987) ties in to her Avalon Series, which tells the story of how the ancient druids were descendants of the survivors of Atlantis who landed in Britain.
 Bertolt Brecht's 1935 poem "Questions From a Worker Who Reads", written to emphasize the role played by the lower classes in history, includes the lines: "Even in fabled Atlantis, the night that the ocean engulfed it / The drowning still cried out for their slaves".
 In John Brunner's The Atlantic Abomination (1960), Atlantis was dominated by giant alien beings who had the mental power to control humans and make them into completely obedient slaves. The sinking of the continent broke their power and set the surviving humans free to eventually create the present civilization. But American researchers in the depth of the Atlantic inadvertently waken one of these beings from a long hibernation on the sea bottom – with highly unpleasant results...
 Fredric Brown's 1949 short story "Letter to a Phoenix" mentions Atlantis as the most recent civilization of six that the immortal narrator has lived in.
 Edgar Rice Burroughs' Tarzan series features a lost city known as Opar, said to be a colony of Atlantis, first appearing in The Return of Tarzan (1913).
 The 1975 novel Romance of Atlantis by Taylor Caldwell.
 In Pastwatch: The Redemption of Christopher Columbus (1996) by Orson Scott Card Atlantis is given passing mention; it is revealed through a machine that can look into the past that Atlantis was a 'raft city' on the banks of the Red Sea, and was completely submerged when the water from the Mediterranean and Indian Oceans came over the natural dams.
 Lincoln Child's 2007 novel Deep Storm features a supposed find of the site of sunken Atlantis. The reality is much more sinister.
 In Eoin Colfer's Artemis Fowl series, Atlantis is a Lower Elements city populated by Atlanteans first appearing in Artemis Fowl: The Atlantis Complex (2010).
 In book three of Bruce Coville's Alien Adventures series, The Search for Snout (1995), Rod Albright's Father is eventually revealed as an Atlantean starfarer, from 35,000 years ago.
 The 1999 novel Atlantis Found by Clive Cussler, inspired by the non-fiction book When the Sky Fell by Rand & Rose Flem-Ath.
 Kara Dalkey's Water Trilogy (2002) is a blend of Atlantis and Arthurian legends.
 Alyssa Day's Warriors of Poseidon series is a modern day twist combining Paranormal Romance novels and the myth of Atlantis.
 Arthur Conan Doyle's 1929 science fiction novel The Maracot Deep describes the discovery of the sunken remains of Atlantis by a deep-sea diving expedition, who find that it is still inhabited by a high-technology society which has adapted to life underwater.
 In The Towers of February (1973), the Dutch writer Tonke Dragt describes Atlantis as a country in the parallel world IMFEA (Inter Menses Februarium Et Aprilem).
 Diane Duane's 1985 young adult fantasy novel Deep Wizardry describes how the downfall of Atlantis was triggered by the failure of an ancient wizardry meant to preserve the balance of the earth and sea.
 Atlantis is also referenced in Neverwhere (1996), by Neil Gaiman.
 Jane Gaskell's Atlan Saga features the young Atlantean princess Cija, who considers the continent's vicious Emperor Zerd as "The most vile man alive".
 David Gemmell's fantasy novels make use of story of Atlantis in the Jon Shannow series (Wolf of Shadow, The Last Guardian and Bloodstone) and the Stones of Power series (Ghost King and Last Sword of Power).
 The 2005 novel Atlantis by David Gibbins.
 Intended to be the fifth book in its Godzilla novel series, Godzilla and the Lost Continent would have seen Godzilla encounter monsters on a landmass risen from the Pacific sea, rather than the Atlantic, which might have been Atlantis. However, the book was never published by Random House Publishing, which had produced the previous four books, for reasons unknown.
 In the novel Raising Atlantis (2005) and its sequels by Thomas Greanias,  Atlantis is depicted as being buried beneath the ice of Antarctica, suggesting a large climate shift took place and covered up the ancient city.
 In Traci Harding's An Echo in Time: Atlantis (1997), Tory Alexander travels back in time to visit the lost city paradise of Atlantis, and its superior civilization, where she is taught of the mind sciences and expands her psychic capabilities, and is inspired of a city plan which features in later books.
 Robert A. Heinlein's 1941 novella Lost Legacy imagined Atlantis as a colony of Mu. In a war for independence both lands sank.
 In the short stories of Robert E. Howard, the character Kull was an Atlantean – this version of Atlantis being inhabited by Barbarian tribes – and eventually became King of the civilized Valusia. His more famous character Conan the Cimmerian was descended from these Atlanteans.
 John Jakes' 1972 novel Mention My Name in Atlantis takes a humorous and satirical look at the Atlantis myth, being narrated by an Atlantean con-man whose account is manifestly unreliable. 
 William Joyce's Guardians of Childhood series mentions the wizard Ombric Shalazar as being the last survivor of Atlantis.
 In Sherrilyn Kenyon's Dark-Hunter series, the leader of the Dark-Hunters is an Atlantean god.
 Henry Kuttner's Atlantis stories feature the sword-and-sorcery adventures of the hero Elak.
 Henry Kuttner's Hogben series feature a family of mutants originating in Atlantis, which was destroyed in a nuclear catastrophe.
 Mercedes Lackey's Dragon Jousters series is loosely based on the myth of Atlantis, as well as on the predynastic period of Ancient Egypt.
 In the Pendragon Cycle of Stephen R. Lawhead survivors of Atlantis settle in Britain.
 In C. S. Lewis's The Magician's Nephew (1955), Digory Kirke's uncle Andrew received a box with Atlantean symbols from his dying godmother that contained dust from another world that he used to make the magic rings that sent Digory and his friend Polly Plummer to the worlds of Charn and Narnia.
 In C.S. Lewis's That Hideous Strength (1945), it is debated by two of the villains that the character of Merlin may be from Numinor or as it is more commonly known, Atlantis. Other characters in the book believe that Merlin was not himself from Atlantis/Numenor but was rather the last in a long-lasting magical tradition which was started by refugees from the sunken continent, who brought magical knowledge to prehistoric Britain.    
 H. P. Lovecraft's "The Temple" (1920) tells the story of a German Naval submarine sinking to the bottom of the ocean after a World War I battle and ultimately settling on the lost city of Atlantis.

 The 2007 novel The Hunt For Atlantis by Andy McDermott revolves around the main character's searching for the last location of the survivors  of Atlantis using a recovered piece of Orichalcum.
 Walter Moers' 1999 novel The 13½ Lives of Captain Bluebear bases several chapters in Atlantis, a megacity and capital of Zamonia. It is described as having every civilization in time occupying it, since sailors came here from every period and stay. The tale includes some real creatures, as well as a myriad of fantasy ones which make up the citizenry.
 Talbot Mundy's King of the World (1930–31) featured Jimgrim, the dashing adventurer appearing in many of Mundy's books, battling an antagonist named Dorje, who has discovered the scientific secrets of Atlantis and is using them in an attempt to conquer the world. 
 Edith Nesbit's The Story of the Amulet (1906) contains a chapter describing the fall of Atlantis.
 Stories in Larry Niven's The Magic Goes Away series often mention Atlantis or feature Atlantean characters. The Burning City (2000), a novel by Niven and Jerry Pournelle set in that same fictional universe, features an Atlantean wizard. Within the novel the wizard briefly tells the story of how waste and misuse of mana, the scarce "magic energy" resource, had caused the sinking of Atlantis.
 David Maclean Parry's The Scarlet Empire (1906) is a political satire set in Atlantis.
 Stel Pavlou places Atlantis two miles under the ice in Antarctica in the adventure novel Decipher (2001). He also suggests orichalcum was pure C60.
 Diana L. Paxson wrote Ancestors of Avalon (2004), a book linking Bradley's Fall of Atlantis with the rest of Avalon Series.
 Charles Portis's comic novel Masters of Atlantis concerns the establishment, and problems thereafter, of a cult dedicated to exploring the secrets and wisdom of Atlantis, gleaned from a short text supposedly recovered from Atlantis.
 In Ayn Rand's 1957 novel Atlas Shrugged, Dagny Taggart searches for a technologically advanced city many other characters refer to as Atlantis. One of the many stories told of the novel's major character John Galt was that he had devoted his life to sailing the oceans and searching for Atlantis and finally saw its lights on the sea bottom – though this is a metaphor rather than a literal depiction of the character's life.
 In Mothstorm (2008), the final book of Philip Reeve's Larklight Trilogy, it is claimed that Atlantis was a lost continent on which the Mercurians had a colony before they left the Solar System thousands of years ago.
 In A. G. Riddle's Origin series the Atlantians are a species of human on a separate planet. The 'city' of Atlantis is actually a crashed spaceship, with a larger ship on the moon. The human race has had its genetic evolution accelerated by these crashed Atlantians in their pursuit of science and military domination.
In his Sigma Force novel The Bone Labyrinth (2015), James Rollins depicts an elaborately decorated and protected, hidden city of Atlantis, located in Ecuador, to which the maps and writings by Kircher and his followers lead the characters. A skirmish there, between the protagonists and antagonists, leads to the destruction of the city and its artifacts. Rollins describes Atlantis' creators as Watchers, a superior hybrid species of humans who disseminated knowledge and possibly interbred with people throughout the world.
In M. Sasinowski's Blood of Ra series, the Rathadi and Pureans are two ancient races that inhabited Atlantis. 
 Michael Scott's series The Secrets of the Immortal Nicholas Flamel centers much of the storyline around Atlantis (referred to as 'Danu Talis"). The magical 'elders' and their Shadow Realms' originate from Danu Talis.
 Darren Shan's Dark Calling (2009) features a destroyed planet that is said to be Atlantis. The myths about the place apparently originated from visits that the atlanteans made to earth.
 In Robert Shea and Robert Anton Wilson's The Illuminatus! Trilogy (1975) Hagbard Celine and crew travel to sites in submerged Atlantis. A portion of Atlantean history is also included in the book and it is suggested that the island of Fernando Pó (part of Equatorial Guinea) is the last surviving remnant of the continent. Shea and Wilson's story suggests that the Illuminati has its origins in Atlantis.
 Robert Sheckley's short story "King's Wishes" (1953) features a genie who travels in time from the past in order to get advanced technology from the 20th Century. When the people he attempts to buy it from express concern it might cause a temporal paradox, the genie states he is from Atlantis, which will be destroyed along with the technology within a few years.
 Heart of The Dragon, Jewel of Atlantis, The Nymph King, and The Vampire's Bride are a series of books by paranormal romance author Gena Showalter. They depict the magical hidden underwater land of Atlantis where the Greek Gods banished the horrible races of beings that were the product of the Titans.
 E. E. "Doc" Smith mentions Atlantis in Triplanetary (1934) as an advanced society ultimately destroyed by nuclear weapons which extinguished civilisation before it could get too powerful.
 In Neal Stephenson's 1995 far-future novel The Diamond Age Atlantis is an Anglo-Saxon Great Phyle, mainly based on artificial islands but with enclaves elsewhere.
 Jonathan Stroud's novel The Amulet of Samarkand mentions Atlantis as a former Greek colony on the island of Santorini in the Mediterranean
 Christia Sylf's Markosamo le Sage (1973) takes place during the Atlantean age.
 J. R. R. Tolkien's The Silmarillion (1977) includes the Akallabêth of Atalantë (The Downfallen), the history of his adaptation of Atlantis, known as the Island of Númenor or Westernesse, where the Númenóreans lived. Númenor was the home of the most advanced civilization of Men in the history of Middle-earth, and, much like Atlantis, the Island of Númenor was swallowed into the sea in a single night. (Aragorn of The Lord of the Rings is descended from the survivors of this people.) Atalantë was the name given to Númenor after its Downfall, not used in the time when it existed.
 In Aleksey Nikolayevich Tolstoy's novel Aelita (1923), soviet engineer Mstislav Los' and a retired soldier Alexei Gusev arrive on Mars and find a civilization of Atlantis survivors.
 The novella in the December 2005 issue of Analog Science Fiction and Fact titled "Audubon in Atlantis" by Harry Turtledove. In this story, which is an alternate history tale, Atlantis is not mythical at all, but is the result of the eastern portion of the North American continent (consisting of the present day Eastern Coast of the United States, extreme Southern Canada, Cuba and various Caribbean islands) breaking off from the rest of North America around 85 million years ago. This was followed by several more Turtledove stories and novels detailing various times and incidents in the history of this Atlantis.
 In Matthew Reilly's 2018 novel The Secret Cities, Atlantis (Atlas) is one of the secret cities.

Comics

Manga and anime
 Dartz, the main antagonist in the Yu-Gi-Oh! "Waking the Dragons" story arc is from an Atlantis that was destroyed when all its inhabitants became their "True" evil selves after being exposed to a miracle substance known as "orichalcos". In addition, Yugi, Joey, and Kaiba all possess legendary dragons by the names of Timaeus, Hermos, and Critias, respectively; this is in reference to the dialogues of Plato by the same name that account the events of the cataclysm.
 In 1989–1990, Gainax of the NHK group of Animation producers in Japan based an Atlantis story on Jules Verne's science fiction novel Twenty Thousand Leagues Under the Sea, called Nadia: The Secret of Blue Water. It has been speculated that many ideas from the Disney film Atlantis: The Lost Empire came from the Japanese anime television series, leading many of Nadia fans to accuse the film of plagiarism. The main character, Nadia, is the lost princess of Atlantis and a descendant of the Atlanteans. And the series main villains, the Neo-Atlantean empire, pretend to recover the lost Blue Water stones of Atlantis and use them to rule the world.
 In episode 16 of Night Head Genesis, the continents of Atlantis, Lemuria and Mu are mentioned. It was said that these highly advanced civilizations capable of both space and time travel fell due to the impact the Minus Energy had on the Earth.
 イリヤッド　～入矢堂見聞録～ A manga series created by Uoto Osamu and Toshusa Garaku about a former archaeologist from Japan and his search for the legendary city of Atlantis. The story combines all the modern and ancient theories of the exact location of Atlantis and the civilizations that are said to be influenced by it. Published by Shogakukan Inc.
 In manga (and anime) Ōgon Bat the main character is a hero from Atlantis, accidentally resurrected.
In Manga (and anime) Doraemon, A Long Story is based on Atlantis, which was later adapted in a Doraemon feature film. In the synopsis, Doraemon, Nobita and their friends go underwater camping. They get kidnapped by the Soldiers of Mu Federation. They befriend Eru who is one of them. In the Story, Atlantis was the Sunk City which was controlled by a malfunctioned but powerful computer named Poseidon. 
 In Saint Seiya, the sunken Island of Atlantis is the sanctuary and base for the god Poseidon.
 In the anime Super Atragon and Super Atragon part II, Earth finds itself at war with a civilization far in advance of their own, which is potentially either Atlantis, Mu, or Lemuria.
 In The Mysterious Cities of Gold, Atlantis goes to war with the Empire of Mu, over a trivial misunderstanding, and using powerful superweapons manage to destroy one another. Both become sunken continents.
 The manga (and the subsequent anime television series) The Vision of Escaflowne takes place in a world, Gaea, mirrored to ours where Atlanteans were a race of winged people who fell in some catastrophic event. The technology of flying ships on Gaea is borrowed heavily from Edgar Cayce, who had psychic visions of flying ships powered by magical crystals.  One of the main characters, Van, is said to have descended from the people of Atlantis. The people of Atlantis, also referred to as the Draconians or Dragon People (ryū-jin), were responsible for creating the mystical world of Gaea using the power of wishes, and the story of Escaflowne revolves largely around Emperor Dornkirk's attempt to regain that power. Note that the film version of Escaflowne does not involve Atlantis in any way.
 Transformers: Cybertron, an animated series based on a popular toyline, featured the lost continent of Atlantis as an ancient Cybertronian starship which, instead of floating in the water, floated in the atmosphere close to the ground. The location of Atlantis and an ancient Cybertronian artifact, the Omega Lock, was a major focus of the series' initial thirteen-episode arc. In Transformers: Armada, humans were shown to have colonized it at some point in the past.
 In One Piece, an island by the name of Fishman Island is located at the bottom of the sea, inhabited by mermaids and fishmen, and a possible nod to Atlantis.
In Seiichi Takayama's light novel series The Master of Ragnarok & Blesser of Einherjars ninth volume's epilogue, Takao Saya reveals a prediction of what exactly the world of Yggdrasil is to Yuuto Suoh who had returned to that world with Mitsuki Shimoya, predicting Yggdrasil to have a very high chance of being Atlantis prior to its inevitable destruction, a conclusion she had drawn from putting all the clues, stories, and theories that Yuuto had brought back from Yggdrasil to modern Earth together (as since Yuuto had already proved that Yggdrasil is a location on Earth at somewhere between 50 to 52 degrees latitude in the Northern Hemisphere sometime between 2000 and 1300 BC, the Late Bronze Age).

Motion pictures

Films
 1936: Undersea Kingdom, Unga Khan seeks to conquer Atlantis and the surface world.
 1959: Journey to the Center of the Earth features the explorers who are trying to reach the core of the earth coming upon the remains of Atlantis far below the earth's surface.
 1961: Atlantis, the Lost Continent, a science fiction film in which Atlantis is ruled by King Cronus (Kronos), who is manipulated by the wicked sorcerer. The storyline concerns the events leading up to the total destruction of the fictional continent of Atlantis during the time of Ancient Greece.
 1961: Hercules and the Conquest of Atlantis, starring Reg Park and Fay Spain.
 1978: Warlords of Atlantis posits that there is not just one but seven cities of Atlantis.
 1979: Island of Mutations starring Barbara Bach featured the lost city of Atlantis hidden beneath the sea.
 1983: Doraemon: Nobita and the Castle of the Undersea Devil, the Japanese animation film and 4th installment of Doraemon franchise. It is based on Lost city of Atlantis and Mu Federation.
 1985: Cocoon, a small group of aliens returns to Earth to find 20 of their species who were left behind when Atlantis was abandoned 10,000 years before.
 1988: Alien from L.A., in which Wanda Saknussemm finds herself in an Underground World that was once Atlantis.
 1989: Atlantica in Disney's animated film The Little Mermaid may be based on Atlantis. Ironically, in a comic series based on the movie, the actual Atlantis was seen in a history lesson between Ariel and a wizard fish.
 1989: The Lost City of Atlantis is mentioned in Don Bluth's animated film All Dogs Go to Heaven.
 1994: In MacGyver: Lost Treasure of Atlantis, MacGyver is searching for the lost continent.
 1995: Atlantis is responsible for the creation of both Gamera and Gyaos in the 1995 film Gamera: Guardian of the Universe, and may have ties to the kaiju Irys, who is believed to be a mutated form of Gyaos.
 2001: Atlantis: The Lost Empire is a Disney animated film. It featured some of the ideas of Edgar Cayce in which ships and aircraft were powered by a form of energy crystal. This version of Atlantis looks different than what the explorers think it looks like, as it is more similar to an Aztec city than a Greek polis.
 2003: Atlantis: Milo's Return is the sequel to the above.
 2004: The Legend of Atlantis is a Golden Films animated film. It features a brave princess named Elan who befriends Terra, an outsider, to help stop the evil adviser Beliel.
 2008: 10,000 BC, in which the ancient Egyptian-esque race that commands the construction of pyramids are believed by the slaves to have originated from a civilization that sank into the sea. Their king, called The Almighty, is believed to be a god. According to The Almighty's escaped servant, presumably an Atlantean himself, there are once three kings and his former master is the only one who remains. The other two are presumably deceased, thus explaining the pyramids construction. Another scene in the film briefly shows a map depicting a large island in the middle of the Atlantic Ocean and near the ending, the priests attempt to escape from the rebels by a large ship,  presumably the one they once use to escape the sinking of Atlantis.
 2012: Journey 2: The Mysterious Island and Ice Age: Continental Drift (where Scrat arrives at Scratlantis, the scrat version of Atlantis)
 2018: Aquaman, based on the DC Comics superhero of same name, the story  revolved around his quest to become the king in attempt to thwart his half-brother, King Orm's plan to unify the seven Atlantean nations against the surface world. In this film, Atlantis is featured as an ancient lost civilization with technologically advanced society that had existed for more than 50,000 years. In the film, the fall of the civilization is a consequence of Atlantean King Atlan's attempt at weaponizing the powerful Poseidon's Trident. As Atlantis sunk beneath the waves, the technology that caused the destruction eventually helps them adapt to their new underwater home, however the kingdom was later fragmented into seven underwater nations and its survivors have adapted to different environments which consists of the original Atlantis, Xebel, Fishermen Kingdom, The Brine, The Deserters, The Trench, and The Missing Kingdom. 
2018: Hotel Transylvania 3 depicts Atlantis as an ancient monster civilization that sunk but was rediscovered after monsters came out of hiding.
 Several films have been adapted from Pierre Benoit's 1919 novel L'Atlantide.

Television
 In an episode of American Dragon: Jake Long, Fu recalls going to Atlantis in his time-traveling misadventures in which he accidentally unclogs a drain in Atlantis, causing Atlantis to sink.
 In the second season of Jackie Chan Adventures, it is reveals that one of Shendu's siblings, Bai Tza, sank Atlantis to form an undersea empire. When she discovers it in ruins, she tries to sink San Francisco to form a new empire.
 Atlantika – Atlantika is a Philippine fantasy-drama series produced by GMA Network about the fictional undersea kingdom of Atlantika. Atlantika opens with the tale of three lovers: Haring Agat (Gardo Versoza), Reyna Celebes (Jean García) and Barracud (Ariel Rivera). Their love triangle sparks a war that divides the underwater domain and pushes Barracud to the dark side. Aquano the Senturyon (Dingdong Dantes) must fulfill his duty of saving Atlantika by searching for the two lost princesses of the kingdom. One of them will be the woman destined for him (Ruana) while the other must be defeated before she destroys Atlantika itself (Amaya). With four princess-possible candidates to choose from; Cielo (Iza Calzado), Alona (Isabel Oli), Helena (Katrina Halili) and Elisa (Valerie Concepcion), Aquano asks the help of the most skillful Senturyon in Atlantika, Camaro (Rudy Fernandez), to train him for the fight of his life.
 In the Centurions: Power Xtreme cartoon, Atlantis appeared as an underwater city in the two part episodes "Atlantis Adventure" and "Hole in the Ocean".
 The British science-fiction series Doctor Who is renowned for presenting three different versions of Atlantis' ultimate fate:
 In the Patrick Troughton story The Underwater Menace (1967), the second Doctor, Ben, Polly and Jamie discover on contemporary Earth that Atlantis still exists, near the Azores, and a reclusive scientist intends to raise it above the waves again.
 Atlantis had also been mentioned in the Jon Pertwee serial The Dæmons (1971), with the godlike being Azal citing its destruction as a warning of an experiment gone wrong. 
 The Jon Pertwee serial The Time Monster (1972) concerns the plans of renegade Time Lord the Master to control Kronos, an ancient and powerful being worshipped by the Ancient Greek-style Atlanteans, while the third Doctor and Jo endeavour to stop him. Atlantis is located on Santorini.
 Some have argued that The Underwater Menace and The Time Monster depict the flooding and collapse, respectively, of different parts of Atlantis, not the destruction of the whole, so that all three accounts may fit into one coherent narrative. Alternatively, and since the geographical and temporal locations seem to be at odds, the name 'Atlantis' may be taken as a translation convention – via the Time Lord gift that always translates local languages for the Doctor and his companions (and viewers) – referring to different lost prehistoric civilisations. The novel The Quantum Archangel suggests that the Daemons gave the Kronos crystal to the Atlanteans as a test, which they failed.
 In the DuckTales episode "Aqua Ducks", Scrooge, Launchpad, Gyro and Doofus go looking for Scrooge's fortune underwater and discover The Lost City of Atlantis. They bring it to the surface with an invention of a gaseous solution by Gyro. Then in the next episode "Working for Scales" they hook helium balloons to it and make it fly in the sky. Huey, Dewey, and Louie discover The Lost Treasure of Atlantis inside it as well.
 In the 1990s Flipper series, in the episode "Waterworld", Courtney is saved by a diver (Luke) looking for Atlantis (which is revealed to be off the coast of the Florida Keys). Luke reveals to Courtney that his grandparents died while searching for Atlantis and he wants to continue their legacy. Courtney's cousin Jackie suspects that Luke is an Atlantean himself due to the fact he can stay underwater for a long time without scuba gear, can communicate with dolphins and seemingly "morphs" into them while swimming. Later Luke and Courtney go diving and find Atlantis during a massive undersea quake. Courtney is rescued but not before she sees Luke (and Flipper) swim into a cave filled with light. At the end of the episode, everybody gives up hope of finding Luke when suddenly Flipper leaps out of the water with another dolphin (who has designs on his side similar to Luke's amulet). Courtney suddenly feels peace that Luke is all right.
 The GoGo Sentai Boukenger character Morio Makino is obsessed with finding Atlantis.
 In an episode of Hercules: The Animated Series, Atlantis is reigned by the wealthy king Croesus, that bribes many people. When Cassandra, pressed to show off her powers of prophecy, says that Atlantis will sink, the Fates bring out their tapestry to prove that it will not; however, Atropos accidentally slips and cuts Atlantis off, causing it to actually sink.
 In an episode of Hercules: The Legendary Journeys entitled "Atlantis", Hercules finds himself washed ashore on that fabled land and has to contend with various crystal powered devices as well as Cassandra (Claudia Black) who has visions of impending doom for the island.
 In the mock reality series I'm with Busey, Gary Busey claims that a continent called Atlantis existed "10,556 years ago." Busey claims that the Egyptian pyramids were part of a failed Atlantean experiment to connect Earth's energy with that of other planets so that "our energy would expand and be better," but in reality warped humankind's collective DNA, shortening the average lifespan. In other TV appearances, Busey has made claims to have lived on Atlantis at some point in the distant past, through unclear means.
 In the animated TV series Justice League, related series, Atlantis is the home of Aquaman.
Man from Atlantis was a made-for-TV film and a short-lived (1977–1978) series on NBC, created by Mayo Simon and produced by Herbert F. Solow. It starred Patrick Duffy as an amnesiac called Mark Harris, presumably an apparent survivor of the lost continent of Atlantis, who could breathe underwater and endure the high pressures of the ocean depths. Duffy later wrote a novel based on the series, also titled Man From Atlantis, without known assistance from either Simon or Solow; he intended it to provide his own solutions to the mystery, and fill in the gaps in the memories, of Mark Harris.
 Phineas and Ferb episode "Atlantis", in which the title characters and their friends find Atlantis off the coast of Danville.
 The Prince of Atlantis is a short-lived CGI cartoon based on the legend of Atlantis.
 In the SpongeBob SquarePants episode "Atlantis SquarePantis", SpongeBob, Patrick, Sandy, Mr. Krabs, Squidward and Plankton travel to the lost city of Atlantis, to find the world's oldest soap bubble, the Atlantic technology, the Atlantic treasure, the Atlantic arts and the Atlantic weaponry.
 The science-fiction series seaQuest DSV episode "Lostland" deals with Commander Ford discovering a golden helmet and sword with carvings in it claiming it came from the lost continent of Atlantis. When Captain Bridger and Ortiz try the helmet on, they are consumed by an ancient curse held within the helmet.
 In an episode of Star Trek: The Next Generation entitled "Family", a terraformation project to create a new continent on Earth, called Atlantis, in the Atlantic Ocean, close to the Canadian coastline, is described. Jean-Luc Picard is asked to lead the project; unsure of his return to Starfleet in the wake of his traumatic experience with the Borg, he nearly accepts. The mythical Atlantis has also been mentioned twice elsewhere, both times as a comparison when the protagonists have discovered a utopian civilization.

 In the Syfy Universal series Stargate Atlantis, Atlantis is a city-ship created by the 'Ancients' – a race of human-like beings who were much more technologically and evolutionarily advanced than we humans are. Several million years ago, Atlantis was moved from Earth to its final resting place in the Pegasus Galaxy, only to be submerged under a great ocean to protect it from the Ancients' enemies in Pegasus. Eventually the inhabitants were evacuated back to Earth through Atlantis' Stargate, and their stories gave rise to the legends of Atlantis, the great city, said to slumber under the ocean. Ten thousand years later a team of human explorers led by the civilian, Dr. Elizabeth Weir, travel to Atlantis via Earth's Stargate with a team of scientists and military personnel from all over the world to discover the secrets of the Ancients. (See Stargate)
 The 1987 Teenage Mutant Ninja Turtles cartoon deals with the topic twice. In "The Lost Queen of Atlantis", the island temporarily arises from the sea outside the coast of Greece. In "Atlantis Awakes", the turtles help a merman Aleem coelacanth AKA Merdude find his way back to a very different version of Atlantis than the version previously featured on the show.
 In the 2003 Teenage Mutant Ninja Turtles series the turtles stumble upon an ancient underground city which is later revealed to be a colony of the long-lost Atlantis (Y'Lyntia, in the series). The city is revisited in various episodes throughout the series and the history of the rise and fall of the civilisation is slowly revealed. The Y'lyntians are also responsible for various races such as the Avians, Mermen and Beasts of Burden which appear sporadically throughout the series.
 In a second season episode of The Transformers entitled "Atlantis, Arise!", modern-day inhabitants of long-submerged Atlantis forge an alliance with Megatron and attempt to conquer Washington, DC.
 In an episode of Transformers: Armada titled "Ruin", the Transformers follow a hologram left by an ancient girl to her underwater city, which is depicted with vast modern technologies. It is stated that the misuse of the mini-cons led to the fall of many Greek colonies, and this one is most likely connected to Atlantis.
 In The Fairly OddParents episode "Something's Fishy!", Cosmo has been known to sink the Lost City of Atlantis nine times and was known as "The Accursed One". When Timmy Turner, as a merboy with the powers of Wet Willie (an Aquaman parody superhero), Cosmo, and Wanda explore underwater, they come upon Atlantis where its people are now merpeople and when Cosmo is spotted, their leader King Greg plans to sentence Cosmo to be eaten by one of the Kraken that Atlantis owns. After showing King Greg the reasons they should be happy underwater (the Wet Willie movie film persuaded him), Cosmo is no longer "The Accursed One". Unfortunately, a giant squid that Timmy tried to call to prove to the Atlanteans it existed had appeared and demolished Atlantis causing the Atlanteans to target Timmy ("The New Accursed One") now and the group escapes with some fish to "Clevelandlantis".
 In an animated The Godzilla Power Hour episode, it was featured as a giant UFO that blasted off of Earth after Godzilla defeated the security droid guarding Atlantis. Episode is The Colossus Of Atlantis.
 In "The Monkey Suit" episode of The Simpsons, Homer Simpson has a To Do-list upon which the item "Find, destroy Atlantis" is already checked.
 According to an episode of the TV show Time Cracks, Atlantis was originally a town in the middle of the desert.
 In an episode of Transformers: Cybertron titled "Deep", the Autobots are led to an underwater city in hopes of finding the mythical Omega Lock. As it turns out, Atlantis is a colonial Autobot ship that predates human evolution and which crashed on Earth, creating the legend of Atlantis as we know it. The starship Atlantis was surfaced and used many times in the series.
 In an episode of Xiaolin Showdown, Dojo has been the cause of the Atlantis sinking the last time he has been released from his cage.
 The Japanese giant monsters Gamera and Gyaos are the result of Atlantean engineering in films of the 1990s. It was hinted that Gamera was from Atlantis in his debut film, although never elaborated.
 Atlantis, 2011 BBC One production starring Stephanie Leonidas as Pinaruti, Reece Ritchie as Yishharu, Langley Kirkwood as Rusa, and Tom Conti as the Narrator.
 Atlantis is the setting of the 2013 BBC One fantasy series of the same name.
 In the TV series Young Justice, 12000 Atlantis was a small village on a now-sunken continent in the middle of the Atlantic Ocean, populated by super-powered humans fathered by its founder, Vandal Savage. It grew to be a highly advanced civilization until the entire continent was sunk by The Light, the show's primary antagonists. The water-breathing survivors of this cataclysm evolved to become Atlanteans, inhabiting various underwater city-states, such as the main character Aqualad (Kaldur'ahm).
 In the Futurama episode "The Deep South", Fry, Farnsworth, Leela, Bender and the others discover the lost city of Atlanta, a parody of Atlantis. It also includes Donovan singing a parody of his song "Atlantis".
 Atlantis is mentioned in The Librarians episode "And the Point of Salvation". A mystical stone salvaged from the city is used to power an experimental quantum computer, resulting in the creation of both a time loop and a pocket dimension based on a video game the computer copied.
 In the first episode of the 2017 reboot of DuckTales, "Woo-oo!", Huey, Dewey, Louie, Webby, Scrooge, and Launchpad venture to find Atlantis, which to their surprise is upside down. However, Flintheart Glomgold was following them, with Scrooge's nephew, Donald Duck. He ends up blowing up the city with his goonies and the others inside.
 The second half of the Laff-A-Lympics episode "Louisiana and Atlantis" features two Olympic-like events located in Atlantis: the Seahorse Race where three players can ride on their oversized seahorses to race on, and the Mermaid Rescue where one of the three players can swim the farthest to rescue one mermaid portrayed by Cindy Bear.
 In episode 6 of Good Morning Today, Krish Goldstein visited the Atlantis in the alternate universe where the TV series takes place. While Atlantis still sank into the ocean, it mysteriously emerged from the ocean in August 1974 (the same day when Richard Nixon resigned from office) following an underwater volcanic eruption. It is now a vacation wonderland upon being auctioned off to some Florida real-estate developers.
 In the Good Omens episode "Saturday Morning Funtime," Adam Young reads about things in a conspiracy magazine that Anathema also talks about that start to become true. One of them involves the reappearance of Atlantis which caused a cruise ship to run aground on it. The people on the cruise ship met some Atlanteans with the internet pictures of Atlantis making the news. Crowley's globe places Atlantis in between Africa and South America.
In the animated sci-fi comedy series Rick and Morty episode "The Ricklantis Mixup," the episode opens with Rick and Morty making plans to visit Atlantis, although the rest of the episode takes place at the Citadel of Ricks. The episode title is a reference to the fact that the stories were "mixed up."

Games

Role-playing games
Atlantis has been used in a variety of role playing games.
 In the d20 Modern Menace Manual, Atlantis was referenced as a large island in the Aegean Sea, which used to be a permanent base for a race called the Fraal (another name for greys), in which Fraal and human society coexisted, but they retreated to the outer edges of the solar system when "some sort of accident" (sic) destroyed it, along with all traces of its inhabitants.
 The remnants of Atlantis sought refuge within the Hollow Earth in Hollow Earth Expedition, although this society too has mysteriously disappeared, leaving behind vast ruins and strange, psychic crystal-powered artifacts.
 In White Wolf Studio's Mage: The Awakening, Atlantis is depicted as the land where humankind first discovered magic, but it was destroyed during the Celestial War, wherein the Oracles and the Exarchs battled for control of reality.
 In Palladium Books' Rifts, Atlantis is a large continent in the middle of the Atlantic Ocean that was tied to the magical energies of earth. As the magical energies of earth dissipated, the island disappeared into a dimensional limbo until the "Coming of the Rifts" caused a resurgence of magical energies on the planet. In the current Rifts timeline, the continent of Atlantis is ruled by extra-dimensional slave traders known as the Splugorth. The original human residents of Atlantis, known as True Atlanteans, are masters of Stone and Tattoo magic, and have spread across the Megaverse.
 In C.J. Carella's WitchCraft and Armageddon, Atlantis is one of the Elder Kingdoms destroyed by the Angels through a giant Flood, and the original home of the Immortals.

Video games
 In Atlantis no Nazo, Atlantis is featured as the setting that is explored by the main character.
 In Assassin's Creed Odyssey, Atlantis is a lost Isu City and explored by the protagonists to understand the origin of the Staff of Hermes and learn more about Pythagoras himself. It is located under the ancient Greek island of Thera.
 In Age of Mythology the first few levels of the campaign are set in Atlantis. Arkantos, the main character throughout the campaign, is Atlantean, and the civilization worships Poseidon as its main god. The game also shows Atlantis' location to be off the coast of Portugal. At the end of the campaign, a great battle causes most of the island to be submerged.
 In Age of Mythology: The Titans, the Atlanteans are one of the playable cultures. Unlike the other civilizations in the game, which were designed with a combination of mythology and history, the Atlanteans in this expansion were purely fictional. The hero of the story, Kastor, is Atlantean. Atlantis is featured at the beginning and ending of the story line, when Kastor leads the remaining Atlanteans in re-building the civilization.
 The MMORPG game Atlantica Online feature protagonists that are descendants from the now-destroyed Atlantis kingdom. The players constantly fight to stop monsters enraged from the power of the ancient Atlantean stones.
 Imagic released Atlantis for the Atari 2600 in 1982.
 The games Atlantis: The Lost Tales, Beyond Atlantis and Beyond Atlantis III involve the legend. Atlantis takes place on the actual fabled city, whereas the other two games are based on discovering things related to Atlantis. All three games were made by Cryo Interactive.
 In the 2000 Nintendo 64 game Banjo-Tooie, there is a level called Jolly Roger's Lagoon. Most of the level takes place underwater, where you can see Atlantis. It has ancient submerged temples.
In the Super Nintendo Entertainment System game Chrono Trigger there exists an advanced civilization in 12000B.C. called the Kingdom of Zeal, which appears to be roughly based on Atlantis. Like Atlantis, Zeal is destroyed and falls into the depths of the ocean.
 The Wii game Conduit 2, a First-Person Shooter by SEGA, features settings in Atlantis.
 In Crash Bandicoot 3: Warped, Crash must swim through a sunken city somewhere south of Australia. This city is assumed to be Atlantis.
 The MMORPG game Dark Age of Camelot by Mythic Entertainment featured an expansion called Trials of Atlantis, where players got a chance to fight numerous Atlantean creatures on the isles of Atlantis.
 In the 1995 Game Boy game Donkey Kong Land, the second world is known as "Kremlantis". It has temples, underwater ruins, and coral reefs.
 The Atlanteans, though not actually present in the games, played a large role in the first two Ecco the Dolphin games (Ecco the Dolphin and Ecco: The Tides of Time) as the creators of the time machine and the Glyphs. They also created the teleport rings present in Ecco: The Tides of Time.
 The Sega Genesis/Sega Mega-CD game Eternal Champions features a green-skinned Atlantean named Trident. According to the story, Atlanteans were indeed a separate species of humanity, featuring fish-like characteristics. Trident was their champion. The Romans were said to be responsible for the fall of Atlantis, after they rigged a gladiator-esque battle between Trident and a Roman champion. Before Trident could strike the winning blow, a sneaking Roman pushed a pillar down, crushing Trident.
 The Nintendo video game, G.I. Joe: The Atlantis Factor, takes place in Atlantis, which has resurfaced.
 The platform game, Glover features Atlantis as the theme for the first world, containing a mixture of Ancient Greece style architecture and an abundance of water.
 In the 2010 PSP game God of War: Ghost of Sparta, Atlantis is a level in the game, both above and beneath the sea. The theory of the Thera eruption is used in the game. A lava-based Titan named Thera is trapped beneath the city of Atlantis. When the protagonist Kratos encounters the Titan, she begs him to free her, or else both would be trapped there forever. Kratos frees Thera which causes a volcano to erupt, destroying and sinking the city of Atlantis. Kratos' battle with the legendary sea monster Scylla further destroyed the city.  Atlantis was originally going to be a level for the 2007 PS2 game God of War II, but did not make it into the final game. In God of War III, which takes place a while after Ghost of Sparta but was released before then, the god Poseidon says "Atlantis will be avenged!" during the boss fight with him.
 The hero of Hercules no Eikō IV: Kamigami kara no Okurimono is an Atlantean who manages to survive the destruction of Atlantis.
 A LucasArts classic Indiana Jones and the Fate of Atlantis recounts the fictional quest of Indiana Jones to the Lost World.
 In the 2006 video game Marvel: Ultimate Alliance, there are levels where the player goes to Atlantis to help Namor the Sub-Mariner regain his throne and stop a riot.
 In the Master of Atlantas expansion pack Poseidon to Master of Olympus - Zeus, Atlanteans become a new playable civilization in a series of campaigns based loosely on the original material. It also tackles many of the more dubious claims about Atlantis (e.g. Atlanteans being involved with the building of the pyramids of both Egypt and Mesoamerica), albeit all with a rather humorous take.
The Omega Stone, the sequel to Riddle of the Sphinx, climaxes at an Atlantean pyramid at Santorini, and goes on to state that there were two Atlantis cities, one at Santorini, and the other at Bimini. The cataclysm caused by a comet fragment (the titular 'Omega Stone') impacting Atlanti-Santorini caused a malfunction in the laser beam constructed to destroy the comet fragment, and somehow led to the sinking of both cities (precisely how is not made clear). Furthermore, it states that the ancient Egyptians, the Maya, the Easter Islanders, the Cretans and the builders of Stonehenge were all different Atlantean tribes.
 In the 2004 Nintendo GameCube game, Paper Mario: The Thousand-Year Door, the port city of Rougeport rests on the sunken ruins of a legendary civilization that was brought beneath the ocean in a great cataclysm, possibly a nod to Atlantis.
 In Puzzle Pirates, Atlantis was added as a feature on September 4, 2007. It is part of the Sea Monster Hunts feature of the game.
 In the PC game Riddle of the Sphinx, one of the keys used to open the door under the Sphinx depicts a symbol described by the game's inventory as 'Atlantean'.
 In the third Serious Sam game, the hero ends up in Atlantis where he battles hordes of monsters (including the inhabitants of Atlantis).
 In Universe at War: Earth Assault, the Masari faction has a city-ship called the Atlatea. The Maseri went into stasis they sank the ship under the water, which explains the legend of Atlantis.
 In the PC game Wizard101, the underwater world of Celestia is partially based on the lore of Atlantis.
 In Skies of Arcadia there is a sunken continent named Soltis. In the original Japanese it is named Atlantia.
 In The Journeyman Project 3: Legacy of Time, aliens destroyed the entire city to prevent another alien race from obtaining a secret artifact. Gage Blackwood then time travels to Atlantis one day before its destruction and travels around the city in order to locate the artifact.
 In Tomb Raider and Tomb Raider: Anniversary, Atlantis is the root of the Incan, Greek and Egyptian civilizations, ruled by Tihocan, Qualopec and the immortal antagonist Natla, its disgraced ruler. It was buried under a mountain when Natla betrayed Qualopec and Tihocan and poisoned the powers of the Scion. So the cultures scattered to the four winds and left Atlantis forever. It was nearly raised again by Natla to bring about the seventh age, but Lara Croft managed to stop Natla and destroy Atlantis completely. The games feature a series of levels based in Atlantis.
 In Uncharted 3: Drake's Deception, Nathan Drake searches for the Atlantis of the Sands to uncover the secrets of Sir Francis Drake's journey to find the lost city while Sir Francis was working under Queen Elizabeth's rule. 
 The adventure game Zak McKracken and the Alien Mindbenders features some scenes in Atlantis.

Board games
The board game Sentinels of the Multiverse includes 'The Lost Ruins of Atlantis' as a setting.

Music

Artists
 The Austrian band Visions of Atlantis.
 The English band Lower Than Atlantis.

Albums
(Alphabetical by album title)
 The 1982 song "Atlantída" by Slovak singer Miroslav Žbirka
 The 2004 album Atlantis by German Death metal band Atrocity
 The 1967 album Atlantis by Sun Ra.
 The 2004 album Atlantis: A Symphonic Journey by David Arkenstone
 The 2001 album Atlantis Ascendant by British symphonic black metal band Bal-Sagoth.
 The 2006 album Atlantis: Hymns for Disco by K-os
 The 2003 song and album Atlantis Princess by BoA.
 The 2001 album Atylantos, written and produced by Jean-Patrick Capdevielle and featuring Chiara Zeffirelli, Elena Cojocaru, Jade Laura d'Angelis, and Nikola Todorovich.
 The 1999 album Crowning of Atlantis by Therion.
 The 1977 album Ocean by Eloy.
 The 1984 album The Sentinel by the UK progressive rock band Pallas contains a series of connected songs that together make up the Atlantis Suite, a reworking of the Atlantis myth.
 The 2000 album V: The New Mythology Suite by progressive metal band Symphony X tells the story of Atlantis.

Songs
(Alphabetical by song title, then by artist)
 The 2010 song "Atlantis" from Birds and Cages by Christian influenced indie rock band Deas Vail describes the city as a utopia of trapped citizens perpetually waiting for rescue. 
 The 1994 songs "Abyss" and "Atlantis" from the Dreamspace by Power metal band Stratovarius.
 The folk/pop singer Donovan scored a top 10 (Billboard Hot 100) pop hit in 1969 with "Atlantis", a song which begins with a narrative of Plato's account of Atlantis.
 The 1973 song "Atlantis" by Earth and Fire, from the album with the same name.
 The 2012 song "Atlantis" by Ellie Goulding from the album Halcyon.
 The 1993 song by Drum & Bass artist LTJ Bukem is titled "Atlantis".
 The 2021 song "Atlantis" by Noah Gundersen featuring Phoebe Bridgers.
 The 1972 song Ατλαντίς (Μαγική Πολιτεία) (Atlantis (Magical Realm)) by Greek pop-rock band Nostradamos which appeared in their album Νοστράδαμος (Nostradamos).
 The 1963 instrumental Atlantis by The Shadows.
 The 2008 album Swim by The Whispertown 2000 includes a song titled "Atlantis".
 The 1997 songs "Atlantis I", "Atlantis II" and "Atlantis III" from the Orama album by greek doom-death band On Thorns I Lay.
 The 1980 song "Atlantís Calling" by Flash and the Pan
 The 1997 song "Atlantis Falling" featured in the album Iron Savior by Iron Savior. In addition, many of their songs and albums revolve around their version of the story of Atlantis.
 The 1986 song "Atlantis is calling" by Modern Talking
 The song "Atlantis to Interzone" by Klaxons, from the album Myths of the Near Future.
 The 2010 album Survival Story by the Flobots includes a song titled "Defend Atlantis", which contrasts the sinking of Atlantis in the past and climate change in the present day.
 The 2011 song "Fall of Atlantis" by US heavy metal band White Wizzard from their album Flying Tigers (White Wizzard album)
 The 1988 song "Floating City" by Y Kant Tori Read from their self titled album alludes to Atlantis.
 The 2004 song "Forsaken" from The Silent Force album by symphonic metal band Within Temptation has been described  to tell the story of Atlantis.
 The 1994 song "Lament for Atlantis" from the album "The Songs of Distant Earth" by Mike Oldfield. The album is based on the book of the same name, by Arthur C. Clarke.
 The 2007 song "Seattlantis" by The Fall of Troy, refers to the actual city of Seattle sinking into the sea
 The 1977 song "Voyage to Atlantis" by The Isley Brothers
 The 2012 song "Dark Fate of Atlantis" from Ascending to Infinity album by Symphonic Metal band Luca Turilli's Rhapsody.
 The 2016 song "Atlantis" by Bridgit Mendler.
 The 2021 song "Atlantis" from the repackage album of the album "Don't Call Me" by SHINee.
The song "1983… (A Merman I Should Turn to Be)'''" by Jimi Hendrix, mentions Atlantis as the destination for the narrator and his love "Catharina" after escaping permanent wars onland.

Opera

The opera Der Kaiser von Atlantis (The Emperor of Atlantis) was written in 1943 by Viktor Ullmann with a libretto by Peter Kien, inmates at the Nazi concentration camp of Theresienstadt. The Nazis did not allow it to be performed, assuming the opera's reference to an Emperor of Atlantis to be in fact a satire on Hitler. Both the composer and the librettist were murdered in Auschwitz, but the manuscript survived and was performed for the first time in 1975 at Amsterdam.

References

Bibliography
 
 

External links

 Atlantis in John Clute and John Grant, eds., Encyclopedia of Fantasy'' (1997)

 
 
Places in popular culture